Discovery is the seventh original album by Mr. Children, released on February 3, 1999.

Track listing
Discovery - Discovery
Hikari no sasu hō e - To the light
Prism - Prism
Under shorts - Under Shorts
Nishi e higashi e - Go hither and thither
Simple - Simple
I'll be - I'll be
(#)2601 - #2601
La la la - La la la
Owarinaki tabi - Endless journey
Image - Image

1999 albums
Mr. Children albums
Albums produced by Takeshi Kobayashi
Japanese-language albums